The St. Paul's Chapel is a Roman Catholic parish church under the authority of the Roman Catholic Archdiocese of New York, located in Lake Oscawana, Putnam County, New York. The parish was established as a mission of St. Patrick's in Yorktown Heights, Westchester. It was transferred to St. Columbanus in Cortlandt Manor in 1950 and closed in 1966.

References 

1966 disestablishments in New York (state)
Roman Catholic churches in New York (state)
Churches in Putnam County, New York
Closed churches in the Roman Catholic Archdiocese of New York